The cave hyena (Crocuta crocuta spelaea), also known as the Ice Age spotted hyena, was a paleosubspecies of spotted hyena which ranged from the Iberian Peninsula to eastern Siberia. It is one of the best known mammals of the Ice Age and is well represented in many European bone caves. The cave hyena was a highly specialised animal, with its progressive and regressive features being more developed than in its modern African relative. It preyed on large mammals (primarily wild horses, steppe bison and woolly rhinoceros), and was responsible for the accumulation of hundreds of large Pleistocene mammal bones in areas including horizontal caves, sinkholes, mud pits and muddy areas along rivers.

The cause of the cave hyena's extinction is not fully understood, though it could have been due to a combination of factors, including climate change and competition with other predators.

Description and paleoecology

The main difference between the spotted hyena and the cave hyena lies in the different length of the bones of the hind and front limbs. In the cave hyena, the humerus and the femur are longer, indicating an adaptation to environments other than those of the spotted hyena. The former was also a heavier and more robust animal: an almost complete specimen, found from the Los Aprendices cave in northern Spain, was estimated to weigh 103 kilograms. As in the spotted hyena, the females were larger than the males. A study of 16 fossil specimens of Pleistocene Crocuta indicated that the cave hyena was subject to the Bergmann Rule, becoming larger during glacial periods and smaller during interglacial periods. The same study revealed a progressive increase in carnivorous tooth adaptations during glacial periods, indicating that it was an even more active hunter than today's spotted hyena, a behaviour necessitated by the need to feed on calorie rich fresh meat in a freezing environment. Rock paintings in the Lascaux and Chauvet Caves indicate that the cave hyena had the characteristic patches and mane of the spotted hyena. It has been proposed that it possessed thicker fur than the spotted hyena as an environmental adaptation.

Brain
Intracranial digital casts taken from spotted hyenas and two cave hyena skulls showed that the latter had an encephalic volume of 174–218 cm³, higher than today's spotted hyena which has an average volume of 160 cm³. In cave hyenas, however, the anterior telencephalon occupied only 15.9-16.6% of the total brain volume, in contrast to the spotted hyena, whose anterior telencephalon occupied 24.5%. As previous studies show that there is a correlation between telencephalon development and feeding sociability and flexibility in hyenas, it has been proposed, in light of this finding, that the cave hyena didn't demonstrate complex social behaviors or adaptability like the spotted hyena, being instead more similar like brown and striped hyena both known as solitary scavengers.

Diet
The most common prey found in Europe are invariably horses, and in the Srbsko Chlum-Komin Cave alone (in the Czech Republic), horse remains make up 51% of the species present. This predilection for equines is unique when compared with today’s spotted hyenas, which are known to target smaller antelope (impala, gazelle, wildebeest) as well as opportunistically scavenge carrion. Steppe bison remains are generally rare in hyena burrows and it has been proposed that, except during glacial periods, these were avoided to lessen competition with cave lions and wolves. However, certain sites, such as the cave of San Teodoro, where bison make up 50% of the remains, indicate that certain populations of hyenas specialized their hunting where mammoths and bears were scarce, whose carcasses were a main source of food in much of Europe. Cervids are rare or absent in the burrows, probably being too fast for hyenas.

History of discovery and classification

Although the first full account of the cave hyena was given by Georges Cuvier in 1812, skeletal fragments of the cave hyena have been described in scientific literature since the 18th century, though they were frequently misidentified. The first recorded mention of the cave hyena in literature occurs in Kundmann's 1737 tome Rariora Naturæ et Artis, where the author misidentified a hyena's mandibular ramus as that of a calf. In 1774, Esper erroneously described hyena teeth discovered in Gailenreuth as those of a lion, and in 1784, Collini described a cave hyena skull as that of a seal. The past presence of hyenas in Great Britain was revealed after William Buckland's examination of the contents of Kirkdale Cave, which was discovered to have once been the location of several hyena den sites. Buckland's findings were followed by further discoveries by Clift and Whidbey in Oreston, Plymouth.

In his own 1812 account, Cuvier mentioned a number of European localities where cave hyena remains were found, and considered it a different species from the spotted hyena on account of its superior size. He elaborated his view in his Ossemens Fossiles (1823), noting how the cave hyena's digital extremities were shorter and thicker than those of the spotted hyena. His views were largely accepted throughout the first half of the 19th century, finding support in de Blainville and Richard Owen among others. Further justifications in separating the two animals included differences in the tubercular portion of the lower carnassial. Boyd Dawkins, writing in 1865, was the first to definitely cast doubt over the separation of the spotted and cave hyena, stating that the aforementioned tooth characteristics were consistent with mere individual variation. Writing again in 1877, he further stated after comparing the two animals' skulls that there are no characters of specific value.

Analyses of the mitochondrial cytochrome b genes in both modern African and Pleistocene spotted hyenas demonstrated that the two were the same species, and indicate that spotted hyenas migrated from Africa to Eurasia in three waves around 3, 1, and 0.3 million years ago. Analysis of the cave hyena genome also indicates that it is not a separate species but is the Eurasian representative of the Pleistocene spotted hyena.

Relationships with hominids

Interactions
Kills partially processed by Neanderthals and then by cave hyenas indicate that hyenas would occasionally steal Neanderthal kills; and cave hyenas and Neanderthals competed for cave sites. Many caves show alternating occupations by hyenas and Neanderthals. The presence of large hyena populations in the Russian Far East may have delayed the human colonisation of North America. There is fossil evidence of humans in Middle Pleistocene Europe butchering and presumably consuming hyenas.

In rock art

The cave hyena is depicted in a few examples of Upper Palaeolithic rock art in France. A painting from the Chauvet Cave depicts a hyena outlined and represented in profile, with two legs, with its head and front part with well distinguishable spotted coloration pattern. Because of the specimen's steeped profile, it is thought that the painting was originally meant to represent a cave bear, but was modified as a hyena. In Lascaux, a red and black rock painting of a hyena is present in the part of the cave known as the Diverticule axial, and is depicted in profile, with four limbs, showing an animal with a steep back. The body and the long neck have spots, including the flanks. An image on a cave in Ariège shows an incompletely outlined and deeply engraved figure, representing a part of an elongated neck, smoothly passing into part of the animal's forelimb on the proximal side. Its head is in profile, with a possibly re-engraved muzzle. The ear is typical of the spotted hyena, as it is rounded. An image in the Le Gabillou Cave in Dordogne shows a deeply engraved zoomorphic figure with a head in frontal view and an elongated neck with part of the forelimb in profile. It has large round eyes and short, rounded ears which are set far from each other. It has a broad, line-like mouth that evokes a smile. Though originally thought to represent a composite or zoomorphic hybrid, it is probable it is a spotted hyena based on its broad muzzle and long neck. The relative scarcity of hyena depictions in Paleolithic rock art has been theorised to be due to the animal's lower rank in the animal worship hierarchy; the cave hyena's appearance was likely unappealing to Ice Age hunters, and it was not sought after as prey. Also, it was not a serious rival like the cave lion or bear, and it lacked the impressiveness of the mammoth or woolly rhino.

Extinction
The ultimate cause of the cave hyena's extinction is still poorly understood. While climate change has been forwarded as a possible reason, it is insufficient to explain the animal's complete extinction; although the extremely cold conditions following the Last Glacial Maximum (LGM) diminished favourable hyena habitat in Northern Europe, and separated cave hyena populations from their African kin, there were still habitable localities in Southern and Central Europe at that time, and the animal survived many other cold periods during the Pleistocene. In the Iberian Peninsula, climate change was ruled out as the sole cause of the cave hyena's extinction, for although the LGM resulted in a mass extinction of several hyena prey species, the red deer and several other herbivore species survived and would still have adequately sustained hyena populations. In Western Europe at least, the cave hyena's extinction coincided with a decline in grasslands 12,500 years ago. Europe experienced a massive loss of lowland habitats favoured by cave hyenas, and a corresponding increase in mixed woodlands. Cave hyenas, under these circumstances, would have been outcompeted by wolves and humans which were as much at home in forests as in open lands, and in highlands as in lowlands. Cave hyena populations began to shrink after roughly 20,000 years ago, completely disappearing from Western Europe between 14 and 11,000 years ago, and earlier in some areas.

Gallery

See also 
Pachycrocuta

References

External links

 Cuvier, Georges, Note sur les ossemens fossiles d’hyènes, Nouveau Bulletin des Sciences, Tome 1, 1807-1809 (pp. 149–150).

Pleistocene mammals of Asia
Pleistocene carnivorans
Prehistoric hyenas